Exaiptasia diaphana, the pale anemone, is a species from the genus Exaiptasia.

References

Aiptasiidae